Karkabud Waterfall (also in local usage Gor) is a limestone waterfall in Karkabud, Taleqan region, Alborz Province, Iran. It is located in a rocky and mountainous valley. The waterfall's river originate in the highlands of Hesarchal, Mazandaran.

Artistic Aspects
On both sides of the waterfall and under the rocks of the mountain, natural holes exist where calligraphers, Mustanshkin (scribes) of the Quran, lived in these holes and wrote the Quran and other works of Islamic literature. Although the waterfall is not especially tall, the volume of river water through its narrow outfalls is significant.

References 

Waterfalls of Iran
Taleqan County